The Swan is a Grade II listed public house at 46 Hammersmith Broadway, Hammersmith, London.

It was built in 1901, by the architect Frederick Miller, and is in the Free Jacobean style.

References

Pubs in the London Borough of Hammersmith and Fulham
Grade II listed buildings in the London Borough of Hammersmith and Fulham
Grade II listed pubs in London
Hammersmith